Claranet provides network, hosting and managed application services in the UK, France, Germany, The Netherlands (Benelux), Portugal, Spain, Italy and Brazil.

History 
Charles Nasser founded the ISP in 1996 and by 1999 had 150,000 subscribers.

Claranet has grown its business through a number of acquisitions, including Netscalibur in 2003, via net.works uk in 2004 and in 2005 Amen Group, via net.works Europe and Artful. In 2012 Claranet acquired Star Technology.

The company has annualised revenues of circa £375 million, over 6,500 customers and over 2,200 employees. On a constant currency basis, revenues have increased four times in under five years. Claranet was recognised as a ‘Leader’ in Gartner’s Magic Quadrant for Managed Hybrid Cloud Hosting, Europe (2016) for the fourth consecutive year and holds Premier Partner status with Amazon Web Services and Google Cloud.

In 2017 Claranet acquired French company Oxalide and ITEN Solutions, revolutionising the IT market in Portugal.

On 5 July 2018, Claranet acquired NotSoSecure.

References

External links

Internet service providers of the Netherlands
Internet service providers of the United Kingdom
Internet service providers of Germany
Web hosting